GWR 4073 Class 5080 Defiant is a GWR 4073 Class steam locomotive built for the Great Western Railway at Swindon Works in May 1939. It was originally named Ogmore Castle.

Allocations
The following is a list of 5080's shed locations during her career with the GWR and British Railways over time.

Renaming
Prior to 5080's transfer to Cardiff Canton from Swindon, the engine was renamed Defiant in January 1941, commemorating one of the many types of aircraft which had taken part in the Battle of Britain. The engines original name Ogmore Castle was also used on an earlier member of the class and later used by two sister engines; the name was originally allocated to 5056 before it was renamed Earl of Powis in Sept 1937. Following 5080's renaming, the Ogmore Castle was transferred to No. 7007 (later renamed Great Western in January 1948) and 7035.

British Railways
After the arrival of the Britannia Class Pacifics on the Western Region, it was moved to Carmarthen in 1959, staying there until its final move to Llanelli in May 1961.

Withdrawal and Preservation
It was withdrawn in April 1963 and acquired by Woodham Brothers scrapyard in Barry, Vale of Glamorgan, South Wales in October that year.

It was sold to the Standard Gauge Steam Trust (since renamed Tyseley Locomotive Works), initially as spare parts for 7029 Clun Castle, and left as the 62nd departure from Barry in August 1974. Its restoration was completed in July 1987, and it ran for a number of years, appearing on various preserved lines such as the Llangollen Railway Easter 1996. After its boiler certificate expired in 1997, it was sent to be displayed at the Buckinghamshire Railway Centre, where it remained until May 2017 when it was returned to Tyseley.

Defiant is at present stored at Tyseley Locomotive Works, but makes appearances at Tyseley's open weekends as a static exhibit, and a group called "The Defiant Club" are raising money to fund an overhaul of No. 5080 for a return to service on the mainline to work excursion trains.

Gallery 
Below are a set of photos showing 5080 during its career with British Railways alongside its time at Barry Island and in preservation.

References

External links
 'Castle' class details, 5050 - 5099 Great Western Archive

5080
Railway locomotives introduced in 1939
5080
Locomotives saved from Woodham Brothers scrapyard
Standard gauge steam locomotives of Great Britain